Events from the year 1896 in Denmark.

Incumbents
 Monarch – Christian IX
 Prime minister – Tage Reedtz-Thott

Events

 25 January – Børsen, then as a four pages weekly newspaper, is published for the first time.
 18 April – Frants Hvass, diplomat (died 1982)
 1 October – The newspaper Kristeligt Dagblad is published for the first time.
 14 December – A treaty between Denmark and Portugal is signed, establishing diplomatic relations.

Undated
 The first registered herd of Danish Landrace pigs is established.

Sports
 A april  Viborg FF is founded.
 6–15 April – Denmark wins 1 gold medal, two silver medals and three bronze medals at the 1896 Summer Olympics.
7 April – Viggo Jensen wins a gold medal in Men's two hand lift and a bronze medal in Men's one hand lift wrestling.
0 April – Holger Nielsen wins a bronze medal in Men's sabre fencing.
11 April Holger Nielsen wins a silver medal in Men's 30 metre free pistol and a bronze medal in Men's 25 metre rapid fire pistol.
 12 April – Viggo Jensen wins a bronze medal in Men's 300 metre free rifle, three positions.

Cycling
 14–15 Augus  The 1896 ICA Track Cycling World Championships are held in Copenahgen.
 Denmark wins a silver medal and a bronze medal at the amateur event.

Births
 5 January – Eyvind Johan-Svendsen, stage and film actor (died 1946)
 24 January – Johannes Theodor Suhr, Roman Catholic bishop (died 1997)
 7 February – Christian Thomas, gymnast (died 1970)
 4 March – Kai Holm, actor (died 1885)
 8 April – Einar Juhl, film actor (died 1982)
 9 May  Ingeborg Frederiksen, illustrator (died 1976)
 11 June – Julius Bomholt, politician (died 1969)
 12 August – Ejner Federspiel, actor (died 1981)
 31 August – Henning Haslund-Christensen, travel writer and anthropologist (died 1948)
 20 September – Fleming Lynge, screenwriter (died 1970)
 30 October – Carl Erik Soya, author and dramatist (died 1983)

Deaths
 8 January – Carl Adolph Feilberg, businessman (born 1810)
 8 June – Johan Frederik Schlegel, lawyer and civil servant (born 1817)
 19 August– Julius Lange, art historian (born 1838)

References

 
1890s in Denmark
Denmark
Years of the 19th century in Denmark